Moncel-sur-Seille (literally Moncel on Seille) is a commune in the Meurthe-et-Moselle département in north-eastern France.

In the past, inhabitants of Moncel were known by their neighbours as culs crottés ("shit arses"), on account of the unusually clingy mud of their village.

See also
Communes of the Meurthe-et-Moselle department

References

Moncelsurseille